María Alejandra Valero Balaguer (born 18 September 1991) is a Venezuelan female former volleyball player. She was part of the Venezuela women's national volleyball team.

She competed with the national team at the 2008 Summer Olympics in Beijing,  China, and the 2010 FIVB Volleyball Women's World Championship qualifiers.
She played with Barinas in 2008.

Clubs
  Barinas (2008)

See also
 Venezuela at the 2008 Summer Olympics

References

External links
http://nl.scoresway.com/www.kenty.se?sport=volleyball&page=player&id=5114
http://www.fivb.org/EN/Volleyball/Competitions/Olympics/2008/W/Photos/PhotoGallery.asp?Tourn=WOG2008&No=12

1991 births
Living people
Venezuelan women's volleyball players
Place of birth missing (living people)
Volleyball players at the 2008 Summer Olympics
Olympic volleyball players of Venezuela